The 12113⇋12114 Nagpur Pune Garib Rath Express is a Garib Rath class express train belonging to Indian Railways - Central Railway zone that runs between Nagpur Junction and Pune Junction three times per week. It operates as train number 12113 from Pune Junction to Nagpur Junction and as train number 12114 in the reverse direction.

Coaches

The Nagpur Pune Garib Rath Express has twenty AC 3 tier coaches. Unlike some Garib Rath trains, it does not have AC Chair Car coaches. The configuration and number of coaches are adjusted in response to demand on the line.

There is no Pantry car but catering is arranged on board the train.

Service

It is a premier train on the Nagpur Pune sector. Some of the other trains that join Nagpur & Pune are the 11039/40 Maharashtra Express, 12129/30 Azad Hind Express, and 12135/12136 Nagpur–Pune SF Express. It covers the distance of 890.4 kilometres in 15 hours 45 mins as 12113 Pune Nagpur Garib Rath Express (56.51 km/hr) & 15 hours 10 mins as 12114  Nagpur Pune Garib Rath Express (58.68 km/hr)

Schedule

12113 Pune Nagpur Garib Rath Express leaves Pune Junction at 17:40 hrs IST and reaches the Nagpur Junction next day at 09:25 hrs IST . On return, the 12114 Nagpur Pune Garib Rath Express leaves Nagpur Junction at 18:35 hrs IST and reaches Pune Junction next day at 09:45 hrs IST.

Traction

Earlier, the train was hauled between Pune Junction and Manmad Junction by a Pune based WDM-3A handing over to a Bhusaval based WAP-4 or Ajni based WAP-7 for the remainder of its journey.

With progressive electrification, it is now hauled by a Bhusaval based WAP-4 or Ajni based WAP-7 for its entire journey.

Major Stoppage

The train travels at a speed of 60 km/hr and make 8 stoppages en route.
 Nagpur
 Wardha Junction
Dhamangaon
 Badnera Junction
 Akola Junction
Shegaon
 Bhusaval Junction
 Manmad Junction
 Ahmadnagar
 Daund Chord Line
 Pune Junction

The train earlier used to reverses direction at Daund Junction. Now it bypass it by Daund Chord Line.

Gallery

References 

Garib Rath Express trains
Transport in Nagpur
Transport in Pune
Rail transport in Maharashtra